= International Symposium for Personal and Commercial Spaceflight =

Annual conference on private spaceflight

The International Symposium for Personal and Commercial Spaceflight (ISPCS) is an annual conference held in Las Cruces, New Mexico. The conference (started in 2005) is organized by the New Mexico Space Grant Consortium a member of the congressionally funded National Space Grant College and Fellowship Program which is administered by NASA in 1989.

Day one each year starts with the Sugerman Forum, a public portion of the event that discusses and highlights the personal and commercial spaceflight industry. Other elements of ISPCS include workshops, tours and events at Spaceport America.
